Napoleon (also known as Heroes & Villains: Napoleon) is a 2007 United Kingdom television film first broadcast on BBC One on 12 November 2007.  It tells the story of Napoleon's part in the Siege of Toulon in 1793.

It was filmed on Malta and Gozo from November 2006 to April 2007. The Beethoven-influenced musical score took a seventy piece orchestra and was not completed until mid-2007.

Cast

References

External links
 

2007 television films
2007 films
Films set in 1793
BBC Television shows
British television films
Films about Napoleon